Bang Talat is one of the twelve subdistricts (tambon) of Pak Kret district, in Nonthaburi province, Thailand. Neighbouring subdistricts are (from north clockwise) Pak Kret, Khlong Kluea, Thung Song Hong, Tha Sai and Tha It and Ko Kret. In 2020 it had a total population of 47,147 people.

Administration

Central administration
The subdistrict is subdivided into 10 villages (muban).

Local administration
The whole area of the subdistrict is covered by Pak Kret City Municipality.

References

External links
Website of Pak Kret City Municipality

Tambon of Nonthaburi province
Populated places in Nonthaburi province